Maximilian Neuchrist and Tristan-Samuel Weissborn were the defending champions but chose not to defend their title.

Kevin Krawietz and Albano Olivetti won the title after defeating Frank Dancevic and Marko Tepavac 6–4, 6–4 in the final.

Seeds

Draw

References
 Main Draw

Sparkassen ATP Challenger - Doubles